Esther Copley, Esther Hewlett or sometimes Esther Hewlett Copley (née Esther Beuzeville, 10 May 1786 – 17 July 1851) was an English religious tractarian and a prolific writer of didactic books for children.

Life
Copley was the youngest daughter of a silk manufacturer, Peter Beuzeville (1741–1812), and his wife, Mary Griffith Meredith (1744–1811), who were both of Huguenot origin. On her father's retirement, the family moved to Henley-on-Thames, where in 1809 she married the Oxford cleric James Philip Hewlett (1779/80–1820), curate of St. Aldate's, Oxford, and chaplain of the Oxford University colleges of Magdalen and New College. They had three sons, two of whom also become Anglican clerics, and two daughters who married two brothers: Esther Beuzeville Hewlett married Ebenezer Sargent and Emma Hewlett married George Eliel Sargent.

As a widow, Esther married in 1827 William Copley (1796–1857), a Baptist minister in Oxford, whose chapel she had already joined. They moved later to St. Helier, Jersey, then to Eythorne, Kent, but they separated in 1843, perhaps due to Copley's alcoholism, which had already involved her in writing his sermons for him. Esther is buried in the Eythorne Baptist churchyard.

Writings
Esther was a prolific author of children's books, tracts, and books on domestic economy. Cottage Comforts (1825), addressed to the working people, had reached 24 impressions by 1864, for example. Among several other works on domestic matters was the pamphlet Hints on the Cholera morbus (1832), on how to prevent and treat the disease.

Copley's stories for children were mainly didactic, designed to make them thrifty and good by providing examples of moral behaviour. She also wrote longer, non-fiction works for children, including Scripture Natural History for Youth (1828) and a 500-page History of Slavery and its Abolition (1836), which derived slavery from human sinfulness. Family Experiences and Home Secrets (1851) incorporated three earlier books, in which a family is shown to prosper through hard work, foresight and benevolence.

Commemoration
Esther Copley was buried at Eythorne Baptist Church under a tree near the gate, In 1996, a plaque commemorating her and her extended family was erected in the United Reformed church, Henley-on-Thames, where she and her parents had moved in the early years of the 19th century.

Bibliography

Sources
Rosemary Mitchell, "Copley , Esther (1786–1851)", Oxford Dictionary of National Biography. (Oxford: OUP, 2004). . Subscription required, accessed 8 May 2010. This cites D. M. Lewis, ed., The Blackwell Dictionary of Evangelical Biography, 1730–1860, (Oxford, 1995), "Biographical sketch of Mrs Copley". In: Copley, E.: The Complete Cottage Cookery. 11th ed. (London: William Wesley, 1859), pp. v–x, and Baptist sources.

References

1786 births
1851 deaths
Baptist writers
English Baptists
English women non-fiction writers
19th-century English women writers
19th-century English writers
19th-century British writers
English children's writers
English self-help writers
British women children's writers
19th-century Baptists
People from Eythorne